Podbharti is a popular Indian podcast show and the first Hindi podzine. It leads the pack of Indian podcasts along with Podmasti and Podbazaar.

Background
Podbharti provides coverage of News & Views about Indian Blogosphere, Indian language blogging, Tools & technology reviews, Indian Culture and the Entertainment Industry. It was co-founded by Indian blogger duo Debashish Chakrabarty (better known as founder of the Indibloggies) and Shashi Singh. Listeners have equated the experience of listening to the podcasts to 70's style radio, reminiscent of Vividh Bharti. The podcast content has a touch of journalism to it.

The first episode of Podbharti was released in May 2007 in which they presented a retrospective talk on Hindi blogging completing 4 years, a nipping primer on the Hindi Transliteration tool introduced by Google in the Blogger.com service and a report on a controversy in the Hindi blogdom where discussions on communalism took an ugly turn adding bitterness to the whole debate.

Apart from downloading podcasts on music devices, users can also hear them online on Podbharti’s website.

See also
Podcasting in India
Indian Blogosphere
Hindi Blogosphere

References

External links
 

Audio podcasts
Hindi-language mass media
2007 podcast debuts